Tu Tamarua (born 22 June 1974) is a retired Cook Islands rugby union flanker.

Career
Tamarua played for Queensland Reds, in Australia, from 1997 to 1999. He later played for NEC Harlequins, in England, for 2001/02 but missed a portion of the season due to injury. He then played for Swansea, in Wales, for 2002/03, moving to Northland, in New Zealand, in 2003. He moved again to Henley Hawks, in 2004, then to Rotherham, in January 2005. In June 2005, he was assigned for Pertemps Bees. His last season was at Pontypridd, in 2006/07.

Tamarua played for Australia Sevens, in 2000, but played instead for the Cook Islands national rugby union team. He was the first and still the only Cook Islands player to have been selected and played for the Pacific Islanders, in 2004.

External links
Pontypridd profile

1974 births
Australian rugby union players
Cook Island rugby union players
Living people
Pacific Islanders rugby union players
Pontypridd RFC players
Rotherham Titans players
Rugby union flankers
Cook Island expatriate rugby union players
Expatriate rugby union players in England
Cook Island expatriate sportspeople in England
Expatriate rugby union players in Wales
Cook Islands international rugby union players
Cook Island expatriate sportspeople in Wales